Elise Larnicol is a French film, television, and theatre actress.

She was a member of the troop Les Robins des Bois (The Robinhoods), a French humoristic troop formed in 1996 with Pierre-François Martin-Laval, Jean-Paul Rouve, Marina Foïs and others.

Theater

Television

Filmography

References

External links

 

Living people
French stage actresses
French television actresses
French film actresses
20th-century French actresses
21st-century French actresses
1968 births